Gregory the Illuminator (Classical , reformed spelling: Գրիգոր Լուսավորիչ, Grigor Lusavorich;   – ) was the founder and first head of the Armenian Apostolic Church. He converted Armenia from paganism to Christianity in the early fourth century (traditionally dated to 301), making Armenia the first state to adopt Christianity as its official religion. He is venerated as a saint in the Armenian Apostolic Church and in some other churches. 

Gregory is said to have been the son of a Parthian nobleman, Anak, who assassinated the Arsacid king of Armenia Khosrov II. The young Gregory was saved from the extermination of Anak's family and was raised as a Christian in Caesarea of Cappadocia. Gregory returned to Armenia as an adult and entered the service of King Tiridates III, who had Gregory tortured after he refused to sacrifice to a pagan goddess. After discovering Gregory's true identity, Tiridates had him thrown into a deep pit called Khor Virap. Gregory was miraculously saved from death and released after many years with the help of Tiridates' sister Khosrovidukht. Gregory then healed Tiridates, who the hagiographical sources say had been transfomed into a boar for his sins, and preached Christianity in Armenia. He was consecrated bishop of Armenia at Caesarea, baptized King Tiridates and the Armenian people, and traveled throughout Armenia, destroying pagan temples and building churches in their place.

Gregory eventually gave up the patriarchate to live as a hermit and was succeeded by his son Aristaces. Gregory's descendants, called the Gregorids, hereditarily held the office of Patriarch of Armenia with some interruptions until the fifth century. It is in Gregory's honor that the Armenian Church is sometimes called  ("of the Illuminator") or Gregorian.

Early life

In the Armenian tradition, the standard version of the life of Gregory the Illuminator derives from the fifth-century hagiographic history attributed to Agathangelos. According to Agathangelos's account, Gregory was the son of the Parthian nobleman Anak; the later Armenian historian Movses Khorenatsi identifies Anak as a member of the Parthian noble house of Suren. At the incitation of the Sasanian king Ardashir I, who promised to return Anak his domain as a reward, the Parthian nobleman went to Armenia and assassinated the Arsacid king of Armenia Khosrov II after gaining his confidence. Anak was then put to death by the Armenian nobles along with his entire family․ Anak's son Gregory narrowly escaped execution with the help of his nurse, whom Khorenatsi calls Sophy, sister of a Cappadocian notable named Euthalius (Ewtʻagh). Gregory was taken to Caesarea in Cappadocia, where he received a Christian upbringing.

According to Khorenatsi, upon coming of age, Gregory married Mariam, daughter of a Christian named David. He had two children with Mariam: Aristaces and Vrtanes, who would later succeed Gregory as patriarchs of Armenia.

Christianization of Armenia 
After the birth of their sons, Mariam and Gregory separated, and Gregory went to Armenia to enter the service of King Tiridates III, son of the assassinated king Khosrov II. After Gregory refused to sacrifice to the goddess Anahit, the king had Gregory imprisoned and subjected to many tortures. Once Tiridates discovered that Gregory was the son of his father's killer, he had Gregory thrown into a deep pit called Khor Virap near Artaxata, where he remained for thirteen (or fifteen) years. In Agathangelos's history, Gregory is miraculously saved and brought out from the pit after Tiridates' sister Khosrovidukht sees a vision. Gregory then healed the king, who, Agathangelos writes, had been transformed into a wild boar for his sinful behavior. Tiridates and his court accepted Christianity, making Armenia the first state to adopt Christianity as its official religion.

After being released, Gregory preached the Christian faith in Armenia and erected shrines to the martyrs Gayane and Hripsime in Vagharshapat on a spot indicated to him in a vision. Vagharshapat would later become home to the mother church of Armenian Christianity and, by medieval times, called Ejmiatsin ("descent of the only-begotten") in reference to Gregory's vision. Gregory, sometimes accompanied by Tiridates, went around Armenia destroying pagan temples, defeating the armed resistance of the pagan priests. Gregory then went to Caesarea with a retinue of Armenian princes and was consecrated bishop of Armenia by Leontius of Caesarea. Until the death of Nerses I in the late fourth century, Gregory's successors would go to Caesarea to be confirmed as bishops of Armenia, and Armenia remained under the titular authority of the metropolitans of Caesarea. 

Returning to Armenia, Gregory raised churches in place of the destroyed pagan temples and seized their estates and wealth for the Armenian Church and his house. On the site of the destroyed temple to Vahagn at Ashtishat, Gregory raised a church which became the original center of the Armenian Church and remained so until after the partition of the country in 387. Gregory met King Tiridates near the town of Bagavan and baptized the Armenian king, army and people in the Euphrates. In two non-Armenian versions of Agathangelos's history, Gregory also baptizes together with Tiridates the kings of Caucasian Albania, Georgia and Lazica/Abkhazia. He founded schools for the Christian education of children, where the languages of instruction were Greek and Syriac. He established the ecclesiastical structure of Armenia, appointing as bishops some of the children of pagan priests. Gregory is also said to have journeyed to Rome with King Tiridates in an embassy to the recently converted Constantine the Great, but scholar Robert W. Thomson views this as fictional.

The conversion of Armenia to Christianity is traditionally dated to 301, but modern scholarship considers a later date, approximately 314, to be a more likely. Additionally, the history of Agathangelos depicts the spread of Christianity of Armenia as having occurred practically entirely within Gregory's lifetime, when, in fact, it was a more gradual process.

Retirement and death
Some time after converting Armenia to Christianity, Gregory appointed his younger son Aristaces as his successor and went to live an ascetic life in the "cave of Manē" in the district of Daranali in Upper Armenia. The Patriarchate of Armenia would be held as a hereditary office, with some interruptions, by the house of Gregory, called the Gregorids, until the death of Patriarch Isaac in the fifth century. According to Movses Khorenatsi, Gregory sometimes came out from his hermitage and traveled around the country until Aristaces returned from the Council of Nicaea (325), after which Gregory never appeared to anyone again. He died in seclusion in the cave of Manē and was buried nearby by shepherds who did not know who he was. All of the sources indicate that Gregory's death occurred not long after the Council of Nicaea; Cyril Toumanoff gives 328 as the year of Gregory's death.

Historical assessment
Levon Ter-Petrosyan, philologist and Armenia's first president, postulates that Gregory and Mesrop Mashtots had the most influence on the course of Armenian history. James R. Russell argues that both were visionaries, found a champion for their program in the king, looked to the West, had very strong pro-Hellenic bias, trained the children of pagan priests and assembled their own disciples to spread the faith through learning.

Relics and veneration
After his death his corpse was removed to the village of Thodanum (T'ordan, modern Doğanköy, near Erzincan). 

The Mother See of Holy Etchmiadzin and the Holy See of Cilicia in Antelias, Lebanon each claim to have the right arm of the saint, in an arm-shaped reliquary, which is used for the blessing the Holy Myron every seven years.

In the calendar of the Armenian Church, the discovery of the relics of St. Gregory is an important feast and is commemorated on the Saturday before the Fourth Sunday after Pentecost. Two other feast days in the Armenian Apostolic Church are devoted to St. Gregory: the feast of his entry into Khor Virap, the 'deep pit or dungeon' (commemorated on the last Saturday of Lent) and his deliverance from Khor Virap (commemorated on the Saturday before the second Sunday after Pentecost).

Byzantium and the Orthodox world
His relics were scattered near and far in the reign of the Eastern Roman Emperor Zeno. Veneration of Gregory began in the Byzantine Empire in the late 9th century with the ascend of Basil I. A 9th century mosaic of Gregory was uncovered in Hagia Sophia under a layer of plaster in 1847–49 during the restoration by the Fossati brothers. Located in the south tympanum, next to the Fathers of the Church, it shows Gregory standing in bishop robes, blessing with one hand and holding the Book of the Gospels with the other. The mosaic, thought to have been destroyed in the 1894 earthquake, survives in drawing by Wilhelm Salzenberg and the Fossati brothers. Sirarpie Der Nersessian argued that his inclusion in the series of the Church Fathers is explained by the myth of the Arsacid origin of Basil I, likely fabricated by Photios I of Constantinople. Gregory is depicted in two prominent Byzantine illuminated manuscripts—the Menologion of Basil II (c. 1000) and the Theodore Psalter (1066)—and in a number of churches and monasteries, most notably Hosios Loukas (11th century), Church of Panagia Chalkeon in Thessaloniki (11th century), and the Pammakaristos Church in Constantinople (14th century).

Gregory is commemorated on September 30 by the Eastern Orthodox Church, which styles him "Holy Hieromartyr Gregory, Bishop of Greater Armenia, Equal of the Apostles and Enlightener of Armenia."

Italy and the Catholic world

In the 8th century, the iconoclast decrees in Greece caused a number of religious orders to flee the Byzantine Empire and seek refuge elsewhere. San Gregorio Armeno in Naples was built in that century over the remains of a Roman temple dedicated to Ceres, by a group of nuns escaping from the Byzantine Empire with the relics of Gregory, including his skull, a femur bone, his staff, the leather straps used in his torture and the manacles that held the saint. The femur and manacles were returned by Pope John Paul II to Catholicos Karekin II and are now enshrined at Saint Gregory the Illuminator Cathedral in Yerevan. 

On 20 February, 1743, Nardò, Italy was hit by a devastating earthquake that destroyed almost the entire city. The only structure to survive intact after the quake was the city's statue of St. Gregory the Illuminator. According to the city's registers, only 350 out of the city's 10,000 inhabitants died in the earthquake, leading the inhabitants to believe that St. Gregory saved the city. Every year, they mark the anniversary of the earthquake by holding three days of celebrations in his honor. Relics of the saint are kept at Nardò Cathedral.

He is listed on September 30 in the Roman Martyrology of the Ordinary Form of the Catholic Church; his feast day  is listed as October 1 in the Extraordinary Form. He is honored with a feast day on the liturgical calendar of the Episcopal Church (USA) on March 23.

Sculpted by France-based Lebanese-Armenian sculptor Khatchik Kazandjian, the statue was inaugurated by Pope John Paul II. Gregory is depicted holding a cross in one hand and the Bible in the other. Pope Benedict XVI inaugurated the area as St. Gregory the Illuminator Courtyard in February 2008.

Gallery

See also
Eastern Christianity
Gregorids
Vardapet, Armenian preaching monks

References

Notes

Citations

Sources

External links

 Agathangelos: History of St. Gregory and the Conversion of Armenia

Gandzasar Monastery, Nagorno Karabakh

 
 

250s births
331 deaths
Catholicoi of Armenia
Catholicoi of Cilicia
4th-century Armenian bishops
Armenian hermits
4th-century Christian saints
Armenian saints
History of Eastern Catholicism
House of Suren
People from Cappadocia
3rd-century Christian saints
3rd-century Armenian people
Armenian people of Iranian descent